Charles Douglas Davis (born January 16, 1952) is a former American football running back for the Cincinnati Bengals and Tampa Bay Buccaneers of the National Football League (NFL). A 1974 NFL Draft choice from the University of Colorado, he rushed 72 times for 375 yards and caught 19 passes for 171 yards as a rookie, but suffered a preseason knee injury that prevented him from playing in 1975. In 1976, he was traded to the expansion Buccaneers for a future draft choice, which turned out to be a 1977 fourth-rounder. Davis scored the Buccaneers' first-ever offensive touchdown, a 1-yard run in week 4 of the 1976 season against the Baltimore Colts, but later suffered another knee injury and spent the remainder of the 1976 season and the 1977 season on injured reserve.

References

1952 births
Living people
American football running backs
Colorado Buffaloes football players
Cincinnati Bengals players
Tampa Bay Buccaneers players
People from West Columbia, Texas
Players of American football from Texas